Thibaut Van Acker (born 21 November 1991) is a Belgian professional footballer who plays as a midfielder for Lierse Kempenzonen in the Belgian First Division B.

Club career

Club Brugge
Born in Merendree, Van Acker joined the academy at Club Brugge at the age of four. On 3 November 2009, he signed his first professional contract for the club on 3 November 2009, lasting until the summer of 2012. He made his debut for Club Brugge on 26 December 2010 in a 2–0 victory away at K.A.A. Gent, before going on to make a further 7 league appearances that season.

Over the next few seasons, Van Acker played a rotational role in Club Brugge's squad, and he would sign a two-year contract extension in 2011, keeping at the club until June 2014. He joined Beerschot on loan in January 2013, and made 11 league appearances for the club before returning to Club Brugge at the end of the season.

Cercle Brugge
In June 2013, Van Acker signed for fellow Brugge-based club Cercle Brugge on a three-year contract. He made his league debut for the club on 27 July 2013 in a 1–1 draw at R.A.E.C. Mons, their first game of the season, before scoring the first goal of his professional career on 5 October 2013 in a 2–1 win at K.V. Mechelen. Over three years at the club, he made 89 league appearances, scoring 5.

KSV Roeselare
Following the expiry of his contract in June 2016, Van Acker joined K.S.V. Roeselare on a two-year contract. He made his debut for the club on 5 August 2016 in a 2–2 draw at home to Lierse S.K., before going on to make 23 league appearances during the 2016–17 season, scoring once. After making 31 league appearances and scoring 3 goals during the 2017–18 season, his contract was extended by a further year. During the 2018–19 season, he made 25 league appearances dor Roeselare, in which he scored 4 goals.

MVV
In September 2019, Van Acker joined Eerste Divisie club MVV Maastricht on a one-year contract. Van Acker made his debut for MVV Maastricht on 13 September 2019 in a 2–1 defeat at home to SC Telstar, before going on to make 24 appearances for the club during the season, though he did not score. In June 2020, Van Acker signed a one-year contract extension.

Lierse Kempenzonen
On 13 April 2021, Van Acker signed a two-year contract with Lierse Kempenzonen in the Belgian First Division B.

International career
Van Acker has played for Belgium at under-19 and under-21 levels.

References

External links
 
 
 

1991 births
Living people
Belgian footballers
Footballers from East Flanders
Belgian Pro League players
Challenger Pro League players
Club Brugge KV players
Beerschot A.C. players
Cercle Brugge K.S.V. players
K.S.V. Roeselare players
MVV Maastricht players
Lierse Kempenzonen players
Eerste Divisie players
Belgium youth international footballers
Belgium under-21 international footballers
Association football midfielders
Belgian expatriate footballers
Expatriate footballers in the Netherlands
Belgian expatriate sportspeople in the Netherlands